Mary Ann Todd Lincoln (December 13, 1818July 16, 1882) served as the first lady of the United States from 1861 until the assassination of her husband, President Abraham Lincoln in 1865.

Mary Lincoln was a member of a large and wealthy, slave-owning Kentucky family. She was well educated. Born Mary Ann Todd, she dropped the name Ann after her younger sister, Ann Todd (later Clark), was born. After finishing school during her teens, she moved to Springfield, Illinois, where she lived with her married sister Elizabeth Edwards. Before she married Abraham Lincoln, she was courted by his long-time political opponent Stephen A. Douglas. The Lincolns had four sons of whom only the eldest, Robert, survived both parents. Their family home and neighborhood in Springfield is preserved at the Lincoln Home National Historic Site.

Mary Lincoln staunchly supported her husband throughout his presidency and was active in keeping national morale high during the Civil War. She acted as the White House social coordinator, throwing lavish balls and redecorating the White House at great expense; her spending was the source of much consternation. She was seated next to Abraham when he was assassinated in the President's Box at Ford's Theatre on Tenth Street in Washington, D.C., on April 14, 1865. The deaths of her husband and three of her sons weighed heavily on her.

Mary Lincoln suffered from numerous physical and mental health issues during her life. She had frequent migraines, which were exacerbated by a head injury in 1863. She was depressed for much of her life; some historians think she may have had bipolar disorder. She was briefly institutionalized for psychiatric disease in 1875, but later retired to the home of her sister. She died of a stroke in 1882 at age 63. Periodic surveys conducted by the Siena College Research Institute since 1982 have consistently found Lincoln to be among the most poorly regarded first ladies in the assessments of historians. Historians see Lincoln as having been a meddling and disruptive presence in her husband's White House, in large part due to her likely mental illness.

Early life and education
Mary was born in Lexington, Kentucky, as the fourth of seven children of Robert Smith Todd, a banker, and Elizabeth "Eliza" (Parker) Todd. Mary was raised in comfort.  Though her family enslaved human beings, they considered themselves "refined" and were treated as such by their peers. When Mary was six, her mother died in childbirth. Two years later, her father married Elizabeth "Betsy" Humphreys and they had nine children together. Mary had a difficult relationship with her stepmother.

From 1832, Mary and her family lived in what is now known as the Mary Todd Lincoln House, an elegant 14-room residence at 578 West Main Street in Lexington, Kentucky.

Mary's paternal great-grandfather, David Levi Todd, was born in County Longford, Ireland, and immigrated through Pennsylvania to Kentucky. Another great-grandfather, Andrew Porter, was the son of an Irish immigrant to New Hampshire and later Pennsylvania. Her great-great maternal grandfather Samuel McDowell was born in Scotland, and emigrated to Pennsylvania. Other Todd ancestors came from England.

At an early age Mary was sent to Madame Mentelle's finishing school, where the curriculum concentrated on French and literature. She learned to speak French fluently and studied dance, drama, music, and social graces. By age 20, she was regarded as witty and gregarious with a grasp of politics. Like her family, she was a Whig.

Mary began living with her sister Elizabeth Porter Edwards in Springfield, Illinois, in October 1839. Elizabeth was married to Ninian W. Edwards, son of a former governor. He  served as Mary's guardian. Mary was popular among the gentry of Springfield, and though she was courted by the rising young lawyer and Democratic Party politician Stephen A. Douglas and others, she chose Abraham Lincoln, a fellow Whig.

Marriage and family

Mary Todd married Abraham Lincoln on November 4, 1842, at her sister Elizabeth's home in Springfield, Illinois. She was 23 years old and he was 33 years of age.

Their four sons, all born in Springfield, were:
 Robert Todd Lincoln (1843–1926), lawyer, diplomat (U.S. Secretary of War), businessman
 Edward Baker Lincoln, known as "Eddie" (1846–1850), died of tuberculosis
 William Wallace Lincoln, known as "Willie" (1850–1862), died of typhoid fever while Lincoln was President
 Thomas Lincoln, known as "Tad" (1853–1871), died at age 18 (either from pleurisy, pneumonia, congestive heart failure, or tuberculosis)

Robert and Tad (Thomas) survived to adulthood and the death of their father, and only Robert outlived his mother.

Lincoln's career and home life

While Lincoln pursued his increasingly successful career as a Springfield lawyer, Mary supervised their growing household. Their house, where they resided from 1844 until 1861, still stands in Springfield, and has been designated the Lincoln Home National Historic Site. During Lincoln's years as an Illinois circuit lawyer, Mary was often left alone for months at a time to raise their children and run the household. Mary supported her husband socially and politically, not least when Lincoln was elected president in 1860.

Mary cooked for Lincoln often during his presidency. Raised by a wealthy family, her cooking was simple, but satisfied Lincoln's tastes, which included imported oysters.

First Lady of the United States

During her White House years, Mary Lincoln faced many personal difficulties generated by political divisions within the nation. Her family was from a border state where slavery was permitted. Several of her half-brothers served in the Confederate Army and were killed in action, and one brother served the Confederacy as a surgeon.

Mary staunchly supported her husband in his quest to save the Union and was strictly loyal to his policies. Considered a "westerner" although she had grown up in the more refined Upper South city of Lexington, Mary worked hard to serve as her husband's First Lady in Washington, D.C., a political center dominated by eastern culture. Lincoln was regarded as the first "western" president, and critics described Mary's manners as coarse and pretentious. She had difficulty negotiating White House social responsibilities and rivalries, spoils-seeking solicitors, and baiting newspapers in a climate of high national intrigue in Civil War Washington. She refurbished the White House, which included extensive redecorating of all the public and private rooms as well as the purchase of new china, which led to extensive overspending. The president was very angry over the cost, even though Congress eventually passed two additional appropriations to cover these expenses. Mary also was a frequent purchaser of fine jewelry and on many occasions bought jewelry on credit from the local Galt & Bro. jewelers. Upon President Lincoln's death, she had a large amount of debt with the jeweler, which was subsequently waived and much of the jewelry was returned.

Mary suffered from severe headaches, described as migraines, throughout her adult life, as well as protracted depression. Her headaches seemed to become more frequent after she suffered a head injury in a carriage accident during her White House years. A history of mood swings, fierce temper, public outbursts throughout Lincoln's presidency, as well as excessive spending, has led some historians and psychologists to argue that Mary suffered from bipolar disorder. Another theory holds that Mary's manic and depressive episodes, as well as many of her physical symptoms, could be explained as manifestations of pernicious anemia. Mary Lincoln's grief over Willie's death was so devastating that she took to her bed for three weeks, so desolated that she could not attend his funeral or look after Tad. Mary was so distraught for many months that Lincoln had to employ a nurse to look after her.

During her White House years, she often visited hospitals around Washington to give flowers and fruit to wounded soldiers. She took the time to write letters for them to send to their loved ones. From time to time, she accompanied Lincoln on military visits to the field. Responsible for hosting many social functions, she has often been blamed by historians for spending too much money on the White House.

Assassination of Abraham Lincoln

As the Civil War ended, Mrs. Lincoln expected to continue as the First Lady of a nation at peace. President Lincoln awoke on the morning of April 14, 1865, in a pleasant mood. Robert E. Lee had surrendered several days before to Ulysses Grant, and now the President was awaiting word from North Carolina on the surrender of Joseph E. Johnston. The morning papers carried the announcement that the President and his wife would be attending the theater that evening.  At one point, Mary developed a headache and was inclined to stay home, but Lincoln told her he must attend because newspapers had announced that he would. She sat with her husband watching the comic play Our American Cousin at Ford's Theatre, along with their guests Henry Rathbone and Clara Harris. During the third act, the President and Mrs. Lincoln drew closer together, holding hands while enjoying the play. Mary whispered to her husband, who was holding her hand, "What will Miss Harris think of my hanging on to you so?" The president smiled and replied, "She won't think anything about it". That was the last conversation the Lincolns ever had. Five minutes later, at about 10:15 pm, President Lincoln was shot by John Wilkes Booth. She was holding Abraham's hand when Booth's bullet struck the back of his head. Mrs. Lincoln accompanied her mortally wounded husband across the street to the Petersen House, where he was taken to a back bedroom and laid crosswise on the bed there, where Lincoln's Cabinet was summoned, except William Seward, who had been seriously attacked by Lewis Powell, just as Booth was about to carry out his assassination at Ford's Theater, several minutes earlier. Their oldest son, Robert, sat with Lincoln throughout the night and to the following morning– Saturday, April 15, 1865. At one point, Secretary of War Edwin M. Stanton ordered Mary from the room as she was so unhinged with grief.

President Lincoln remained in a coma for approximately nine hours. He died at 7:22 a.m., at the age of 56. Shortly before 7a.m. Mary was allowed to return to Lincoln's side, and, as Dixon reported, "she again seated herself by the President, kissing him and calling him every endearing name." As he died his breathing grew quieter, his face more calm. According to some accounts, at his last drawn breath, on the morning after the assassination, he smiled broadly and then expired. Historians, most notably author Lee Davis have emphasized Lincoln's peaceful appearance when and after he died: "It was the first time in four years, probably, that a peaceful expression crossed his face." Assistant Secretary of the Treasury in the Lincoln Administration, Maunsell Bradhurst Field wrote, "I had never seen upon the President's face an expression more genial and pleasing." The President's secretary, John Hay, said, "A look of unspeakable peace came upon his worn features".

Later life and death
After her husband's death, she received messages of condolence from all over the world, many of which she attempted to answer personally. To Queen Victoria she wrote:

I have received the letter which Your Majesty has had the kindness to write. I am deeply grateful for its expressions of tender sympathy, coming as they do, from a heart which from its own sorrow, can appreciate the intense grief I now endure.

Victoria had suffered the loss of her husband, Prince Albert, four years earlier.

As a widow, Mrs. Lincoln returned to Illinois and lived in Chicago with her sons. Her husband had left an estate of $80,000 which should have been enough to keep her in comfort, if not in style. In 1868, Mrs Lincoln, who had a lavish, unstable relationship with money, advertised in the New York World for aid and attempted to sell her personal effects at auction, which shocked the public. She and her young son Tad moved to Europe and settled in Frankfurt for several years. During this time the Seligman family helped look after her, paying the cost of the voyage, sending her money and advocating on her behalf.

In 1868 her former modiste (dressmaker) and confidante, Elizabeth Keckley (1818–1907), published Behind the Scenes, or, Thirty Years a Slave, and Four Years in the White House. She had been born into slavery, purchased her freedom and that of her son, and became a successful businesswoman in Washington, D.C. Although this book provides valuable insight into the character and life of Mary Todd Lincoln, at the time the former First Lady (and much of the public and press) regarded it as a breach of friendship and confidentiality. Keckley was widely criticized for her book, especially as her editor had published letters from Mary Lincoln to her. It has now been gratefully accepted by many historians and biographers and been used to flesh out the President and First Lady's personalities behind the scenes in the Executive Mansion and been used as the basis for several motion pictures and TV mini-series during the late 20th and early 21st centuries.

In an act approved by a low margin on July 14, 1870, the United States Congress granted Mrs. Lincoln a life pension of $3,000 a year ($ in  dollars). Mary had lobbied hard for such a pension, writing numerous letters to Congress and urging patrons such as Simon Cameron and Joseph Seligman to petition on her behalf. She insisted that she deserved a pension just as much as the widows of soldiers, as she portrayed her husband as a fallen commander. At the time it was unusual for widows of presidents, and Mary Lincoln had alienated many congressmen, making it difficult for her to gain approval.

The death of her son Thomas (Tad) in July 1871, following the deaths of two of her other sons and her husband, brought on an overpowering grief and depression. Her surviving son, Robert Lincoln, a rising young Chicago lawyer, was alarmed at his mother's increasingly erratic behavior. In March 1875, during a visit to Jacksonville, Florida, Mary became unshakably convinced that Robert was deathly ill; hurrying to Chicago, she found him healthy. During her visit with him, she told him that someone had tried to poison her on the train and that a "wandering Jew" had taken her pocketbook but returned it later. She also spent large amounts of money there on items she never used, such as draperies and elaborate dresses (she wore only black after her husband's assassination). She walked around the city with $56,000 in government bonds sewn into her petticoats (underskirts). Despite this large amount of money and the $3,000-a-year stipend from Congress, Mrs. Lincoln had an irrational fear of poverty.

In 1872 she went to spiritualist photographer William H. Mumler, who produced a photograph of her that appears to faintly show Lincoln's ghost behind her (photo in Allen County Public Library, Fort Wayne, Indiana). The College of Psychic Studies, referencing notes belonging to William Stainton Moses, claims that the photo was taken in the early 1870s, that Lincoln had assumed the name of 'Mrs. Lindall', and that Lincoln had to be encouraged by Mumler's wife to identify her husband on the photo. P.T. Barnum, testifying against Mumler in his eventual fraud trial, presented a photo featuring himself with the 'ghost' of Abraham Lincoln, demonstrating for the court how easy it was to make one of Mumler's images. The image is recognized now as a hoax created via double exposure (by inserting a previously prepared positive glass plate featuring the image of the "deceased" into the camera in front of an unused sensitive glass plate).

Due to her erratic behavior, Robert initiated proceedings to have her institutionalized. On May 20, 1875, following a trial, a jury committed her to a private asylum in Batavia, Illinois.  After the court proceedings, she was so despondent that she attempted suicide. She went to several pharmacies and ordered enough laudanum to kill herself, but an alert pharmacist frustrated her attempts and finally gave her a placebo.

Three months after being committed to Bellevue Place, she devised her escape: She smuggled letters to her lawyer, James B. Bradwell, and his wife Myra Bradwell, who was not only her friend but also a feminist lawyer. She also wrote to the editor of the Chicago Times. Soon, the public embarrassments that Robert had hoped to avoid were looming, and his character and motives were in question, as he controlled his mother's finances. The director of Bellevue at Mary's trial had assured the jury she would benefit from treatment at his facility. In the face of potentially damaging publicity, he declared her well enough to go to Springfield to live with her sister Elizabeth as she desired.

Mary Lincoln was released into the custody of her sister in Springfield. In 1876 she was declared competent to manage her own affairs.  The earlier committal proceedings had resulted in Mary being profoundly estranged from her son Robert, and they did not see each other again until shortly before her death.

Mrs. Lincoln spent the next four years traveling throughout Europe and took up residence in Pau, France. Her final years were marked by declining health. She suffered from severe cataracts that reduced her eyesight; this condition may have contributed to her increasing susceptibility to falls. In 1879, she suffered spinal cord injuries in a fall from a stepladder.  She traveled to New York in 1881 and lobbied for an increased pension after the assassination of President Garfield raised the issue of provisions for his family.  She faced a difficult battle, due to negative press over her spending habits and rumors about her handling of her personal finances, including $56,000 in government bonds left to her by her husband. Congress eventually granted the increase, along with an additional monetary gift.

During the early 1880s, Mary Lincoln was confined to the Springfield, Illinois, residence of her sister Elizabeth Edwards. On July 15, 1882, exactly eleven years after her youngest son died, she collapsed at her sister's home, lapsed into a coma, and died the next morning of a stroke at age 63. Her funeral service was held at First Presbyterian Church, Springfield, Illinois.

In popular culture

Biographies have been written about Mary Lincoln as well as her husband. Barbara Hambly's The Emancipator's Wife (2005) is considered a well-researched historical novel that provides context for her use of over-the-counter drugs containing alcohol and opium, which were frequently given to women of her era. Janis Cooke Newman's historical novel Mary: Mrs. A. Lincoln (2007), in which Mary tells her own story after incarceration in the asylum in an effort to maintain and prove her sanity, is considered by Mary's recent biographer, Jean H. Baker, to be 'close to life' in its depiction of Mary Lincoln's life. The grief experienced through her widowhood is a theme of Andrew Holleran's 2006 novel, Grief.
Another historical novel in which Mary Todd Lincoln is depicted is Courting Mr. Lincoln (2019)  by Louis Bayard, centering on Lincoln's relationships with Mary Todd and Joshua Fry Speed, Abraham Lincoln's good friend, in Springfield from 1839 to 1842.

Mary Lincoln has been portrayed by several actresses in film, including Kay Hammond in Abraham Lincoln (1930) directed by D.W. Griffith; Marjorie Weaver in Young Mr. Lincoln (1939) directed by John Ford; Ruth Gordon in Abe Lincoln in Illinois (1940); Julie Harris in The Last of Mrs. Lincoln, a 1976 television adaptation of the stage play; Mary Tyler Moore in the 1988 television mini-series Lincoln; Donna Murphy in the 1998 movie The Day Lincoln Was Shot; Sally Field in Steven Spielberg's 2012 film Lincoln; Penelope Ann Miller in Saving Lincoln (2012); and Mary Elizabeth Winstead in Abraham Lincoln: Vampire Hunter (2012), set during the Civil War. Mezzo-soprano Elaine Bonazzi portrayed Mary in Thomas Pasatieri's Emmy Award winning opera The Trial of Mary Lincoln in 1972.

In 1955, Vivi Janiss played the historical Mary Todd Lincoln in "How Chance Made Lincoln President" in the anthology television series, TV Reader's Digest. Richard Gaines was cast as Abraham Lincoln, and Ken Hardison played their son, Robert Todd Lincoln.

In 2005, Sufjan Stevens referenced Mary Todd Lincoln in the instrumental track "A Short Reprise for Mary Todd, Who Went Insane, but for Very Good Reasons" from his album Illinois, which is themed around the state where she resided the majority of her life.

Family
Her sister Elizabeth Todd married Ninian Edwards Jr., the son of the Illinois Governor Ninian Edwards. Their daughter Julia Edwards married Edward L. Baker, Jr., editor of the Illinois State Journal and son of Edward L. Baker, Sr. Their daughter, Mary Todd Lincoln's grandniece Mary Edwards Brown, served as custodian of the Lincoln Homestead, as did her own daughter.  Mary's half-sister Emilie Todd married Benjamin Hardin Helm, CSA general and son of the Kentucky Governor John L. Helm. Another half-sister Elodie Todd married CSA Brig. General Nathaniel H. R. Dawson, later the third U.S. Commissioner of Education. One of Mary Todd's cousins was Dakota Territory Congressman/US General John Blair Smith Todd.

Regard by historians
Historians have regarded Lincoln poorly as a first lady, seeing her as meddling and disruptive first lady. Lincoln's poor regard is due to the perception of Lincoln as having had psychological conditions that made the life of President Lincoln more difficult. Lincoln is seen as having suffered not just from likely mental illness during her husband's presidency, but also from the personal toll that having two of her children die, including one during her husband's presidency, took on her.

Since 1982 Siena College Research Institute has periodically conducted surveys asking historians to assess American first ladies according to a cumulative score on the independent criteria of their background, value to the country, intelligence, courage, accomplishments, integrity, leadership, being their own women, public image, and value to the president. Consistently, Lincoln has ranked among the most poorly regarded first ladies in these surveys. 

In terms of cumulative assessment, Lincoln has been ranked:
42nd-best of 42 in 1982
37th-best of 37 in 1993
36th-best of 38 in 2003
35th-best of 38 in 2008
31st-best of 39 in 2014

In the 2008 Siena Research Institute survey, Lincoln was ranked the lowest in four of the ten criteria: value to the country, accomplishments, leadership, and public image. In the 2014 survey, Lincoln and her husband were ranked the 7th-highest out of 39 first couples in terms of being a "power couple".

See also
Lincoln family tree

References

Bibliography

Further reading

 Baker, Jean. Mary Todd Lincoln: A Biography (2008)  excerpt and text search
 Michael Burlingame, The Inner World of Abraham Lincoln (Urbana and Chicago: University of Illinois Press, 1994)
 Michael Burlingame, An American Marriage: The Untold Story of Abraham Lincoln and Mary Todd (Pegasus Books, 2021)
 Catherine Clinton, Mrs. Lincoln: A Life (New York: Harper Perennial, 2010)
 Emerson, Jason (2007). The Madness of Mary Lincoln. Carbondale, Illinois: Southern Illinois University Press. .
 Emerson, Jason (2019). Mary Lincoln for the Ages. Carbondale, Illinois: Southern Illinois University Press. .
 Daniel Mark Epstein, The Lincolns: Portrait of a Marriage (Ballantine Books, 2008)
 King, C.J. Four Marys and a Jessie: The Story of the Lincoln Women (Hildene, 2015)

 Neely, Jr., Mark E. and R. Gerald McMurtry. The Insanity File: The Case of Mary Todd Lincoln (1993) excerpt and text search
 Ruth Painter Randall, Mary Lincoln: Biography of a Marriage (Little, Brown & Co., 1953)
 Williams, Frank J. and Burkhimer, Michael, eds. The Mary Lincoln Enigma: Historians on America's Most Controversial First Lady (Southern Illinois University Press, 2012) 392 pages; scholarly essays on her childhood in Kentucky, the early years of her marriage, her political relationship with her husband, and her relationship with her son Robert. Book review

External links
 White House profile
 Mrs. Abraham Lincoln: A Study of Her Personality and Her Influence on Lincoln By W. A. Evans
 Lincoln children
 Mary Todd Lincoln Quotes
 Original Manuscript Letters: Mary Todd Lincoln Shapell Manuscript Foundation
 Mary Lincoln at C-SPAN's First Ladies: Influence & Image
 Mary Todd Lincoln's Seed-pearl Necklace and Matching Bracelets. (A gift from Abraham Lincoln to Mary Todd Lincoln and worn at his second Inaugural Ball. See featured picture at the top of the page.) From the Collections at the Library of Congress

1818 births
1882 deaths
19th-century American women
19th-century Presbyterians
American people of English descent
American people of Irish descent
American people of Scottish descent
American Presbyterians
Burials at Oak Ridge Cemetery
First ladies of the United States
Lincoln family
People associated with the assassination of Abraham Lincoln
People from Lexington, Kentucky
People from Springfield, Illinois
People with bipolar disorder
Spouses of Illinois politicians